Dorothy Page may refer to:

 Dorothy G. Page (1921–1989), known as "Mother of the Iditarod Trail Sled Dog Race"
 Dorothy Page (actress) (1904–1961), American actress, dubbed "The Singing Cowgirl"
 Dorothy Page (historian), New Zealand historian and academic